Lalabad (also Romanized as La‘lābād; also known as La‘lābād-e Qalā'ī) is a village in Qalayi Rural District, Firuzabad District, Selseleh County, Lorestan Province, Iran. At the 2006 census, its population was 250, in 42 families.

References 

Towns and villages in Selseleh County